Menegazzia hypernota is a species of foliose lichen found in Australasia. It was formally described as a new species in 2004 by Jarle Bjerke from specimens collected in New Zealand. The lichen contains fumarprotocetraric acid as the major lichen product in the medulla. Menegazzia hypernota was reported from Tasmania in 2019.

See also
List of Menegazzia species

References

hypernota
Lichen species
Lichens described in 2004
Lichens of Australia
Lichens of New Zealand